Ancrod (current brand name: Viprinex) is a defibrinogenating agent derived from the venom of the Malayan pit viper. Defibrinogenating blood produces an anticoagulant effect. Ancrod is not approved or marketed in any country. It is a thrombin-like serine protease.

Medical use
As of 2017 ancrod was not marketed for any medical use.

Pregnancy
Category X : Ancrod was not found to be teratogenic in animal studies, but some fetal deaths occurred as a result of placental hemorrhages in animals given high doses; therefore, it should not be used during pregnancy as the defibrinogenation mechanism of ancrod might be expected to interfere with the normal implantation of the fertilized egg.

Contraindications and precautions
 Known bleeding disorders of any origin or any unexplained excessive bleedings in the past.
 Platelet counts of less than 100,000 (even if asymptomatic), exemption : HIT (Heparin- induced thrombocytopenia).
 Planned surgery or short before delivery.
 Active ulcerations of the GIT.
 Any kind of malignant disease.
 Renal stones (increased likelihood of significant urological bleeding).
 Severe and uncontrolled arterial hypertension.
 Active pulmonary tuberculosis.
 Impaired fibrinolysis.
 Severe liver disease.
 Manifest or impending shock.
 I.M.-Injection : Ancrod should not be injected i.m., because of rapid induction of neutralizing antibodies and thus drug resistance.

Side effects
In clinical trials for ischemic stroke, ancrod increased the risk of intracerebral hemorrhage.

 Hypersensitivity reactions : Local or generalized skin reactions (rash and urticaria); appearance of neutralizing antibodies to ancrod with partial or total loss of ancrod activity (drug resistance).
 Sometimes pain at injection site (normally mild). This side effect may be, if necessary, treated with local or oral antihistaminic drugs (e.g., clemastine, or diphenhydramine). Bleeding at injection site, thrombophlebitis at local veins, and (paradoxical) arterial thrombotic events.
 Occasionally deposition of cleaved fibrinogen derivates in the spleen resulting in splenomegaly; rupture is possible, if the spleen is palpated too strongly (life-threatening bleeding and need of splenectomy may result).
 Specific side effects are local and systemic bleeding events. Local bleeding events may be treated with local pressure or surgical dressings, if necessary. Compared with other anticoagulants the risk of systemic bleeding is relatively low. If systemic bleeding is severe enough to warrant fast reversal of ancrod action, fibrinogen should be substituted (please refer to section 'special antidotes').
 Occasionally, increased headache has been found in patients with known migraine.
 Also, chills and fever may occur infrequently.

Thrombocytopenia as side effect has never been noticed with ancrod in contrast to heparin.

It was not found to be of much use in the clinical trials. In vitro experiments show that it may actually clot blood.

Pharmacology

Ancrod has a triple mode of action. It was found that ancrod's actions are FAD dependent and that the substance has interesting apoptotic properties (causing programmed cell death), which remain to be explored.

The half-life of ancrod is 3 to 5 hours and the drug is cleared from blood plasma, mainly renally.

Due to its special mode of action (see below) and its price, Arwin has never been used as 'normal' anticoagulant such as heparin, but only for the symptomatic treatment of moderate to severe forms of peripheral arterial circulatory disorders such as those resulting from years of heavy smoking and/or arteriosclerosis.

The substance is intended for subcutaneous injection and intravenous infusion, and indirectly inhibits aggregation, adhesion, and release of thrombocytes mediated through the action of a fibrinogen degradation product (FDP). It also cleaves and therefore inactivates a significant part of circulating plasma fibrinogen. Fibrinogen is often found in increased concentrations in arteriae with impaired circulation. This leads to a pathologically increased blood viscosity and thereby to a worsening of symptoms of the circulation disorder (more intense pain, decreased mobility of the limb and decreased temperature, need for partial or even total limb amputation). The blood viscosity in patients receiving ancrod is progressively reduced by 30 to 40% of the pretreatment levels. The decreased viscosity is directly attributable to lowered fibrinogen levels and leads to important improvements in blood flow and perfusion of the microcirculation. Erythrocyte flexibility is not affected by normal doses of ancrod. The rheological changes are readily maintained and the viscosity approaches pretreatment values very slowly (within about 10 days) after stopping ancrod. One of the cleavage fibrinogen products, termed 'desAA-Fibrin', acts as cofactor for the tPA-induced plasminogen activation and an increased fibrinolysis results in return (profibrinolytic activity of ancrod).

Ancrod decreases the blood viscosity in affected arteries, leads to less intense pain, improves physical limb mobility, and facilitates physical and ergo therapy. Finally, ancrod decreases the likelihood of local thrombotic events. These mechanisms also account for ancrod's activity in other diseases.

Effects on other clotting factors: Unlike thrombin, ancrod does not directly activate Factor XIII, nor does it produce platelet aggregation nor cause the release of ADP, ATP, potassium, or serotonin from platelets. Platelet counts and survival time remain normal during ancrod therapy.

Chemistry
Ancrod was originally isolated from the venom of the Malayan pit viper (Calloselasma rhodostoma, formerly Agkistrodon rhodostoma) and is a serine protease. It is one of the Venombin A enzymes. Two genes encoding for such enzymes have been found in the viper genome.

The form used in clinical trials was not made recombinantly, but was purified from harvested venom.

History 
Under the brand name Arwin, ancrod was marketed for several decades in Germany and Austria, until it was withdrawn in the 1980s. Arwin was a brand name of Knoll Pharma.

In 2001 Knoll was acquired by Abbott Laboratories, and in 2002 Abbott licensed the rights to ancrod to Empire Pharmaceuticals, a startup that included a Knoll employee who had worked on ancrod.   In 2004 Empire was acquired by Neurobiological Technologies.   NTI also acquired a lot of unpurified venom in the acquisition, and had that purified for use in its clinical trials.

The failure of ancrod in the 6-hour window for ischemic stroke  trial in 2008 led to cuts in staff, an effort to sell off the company's assets, and finally to the dissolution of NTI in August 2009.

Society and culture
Viprinex is not currently approved or available.

Research
For the treatment of established deep vein thrombosis; central retinal and branch vein thrombosis; priapism; pulmonary hypertension of embolic origin; embolism after insertion of prosthetic cardiac valves; rethrombosis after thrombolytic therapy and rethrombosis after vascular surgery. It is also indicated for the prevention of deep venous thrombosis after repair of the fractured neck of a femur.

For the treatment of moderate and severe chronic circulatory disorders of peripheral arteries (e.g., arteriosclerosis obliterans, thromboangiitis obliterans, diabetic microangiopathy and Raynaud's phenomenon).

Ancrod has been shown to be useful for maintaining anticoagulation in the presence of Heparin-induced thrombocytopenia (HIT) and thrombosis.

A small study compared to ancrod to heparin in preventing thrombosis when given to people undergoing arterial graft surgery to treat peripheral arterial disease and found little difference between the two agents.

Ancrod was intensively studied in ischemic stroke, starting at least by the early 1990s.  An RCT called "STAT" was published in 2000; it included 500 subjects and ancrod or placebo was administered within three hours of the stroke. Ancrod showed modest benefits but a trend toward increased intracranial haemorrhage. A clinical trial published in 2006 found no benefit if ancrod was given within a wider 6 hour treatment window.  Another trial was launched to explore the 6 hour window, but it was halted early in 2008 when an independent review committee looked at the interim data and found no signal of benefit.

References

See also 
 Batroxobin, another medical snake venom serine protease

External links 
 

Antithrombotic enzymes
Abandoned drugs